Prince Adarnase II (died 945) was a Georgian prince of the Bagrationi dynasty of Tao-Klarjeti branch.

He was the oldest son of Prince Bagrat I of Klarjeti.

Adarnase became a monk and changed his name to Basil. Adarnase received the title of curopalates from Emperor Leo VI the Wise.

References 

945 deaths
Bagrationi dynasty of Klarjeti
10th-century rulers in Europe
Year of birth unknown
Kouropalatai